Banjulunding is a town in western Gambia. It is located in Kombo North/Saint Mary District in the Western Division.  As of 2008, it has an estimated population of 8,029.

References

Populated places in the Gambia